Montserrat Venturós i Villalba (born 1985 Berga ) is a Catalan politician and activist . From 2015 to 2021,  she was mayor of Berga for the Popular Unity Candidacy (CUP) party.

Life 
She studied law at the University of Barcelona. She ran a grocery store in Berga. She is a member of the editorial board of the newspaper "l'Accent" (The Accent) and since 2000 he has been a member of Casal Panxo. She is closely linked to movements to recover historical memory and collaborates with the League for the Rights of Peoples in defense of Chechnya and the North Caucasus .

On 4 November 2016, the Mossos de Escuadra arrested her for refusing to testify on two occasions before the judge, who was filing a complaint against her for not taking down the Catalan independence flag, the estelada, from the balcony of the Berga City Hall.  In June 2018, she was sentenced by Criminal Court No. 2 of Manresa to a three-month fine, at a rate of six euros a day, six months of special disqualification from public office and payment of costs.

References 

1985 births
University of Barcelona alumni
Popular Unity Candidacy politicians
Living people